Saat may refer to:

Beren Saat (born 1984), Turkish actress
Joosep Saat (1900–1977), Estonian politician, journalist and academic
Mari Saat (born 1947), Estonian writer
Othman Saat (1927–2007), Malaysian politician 
Theo Saat (1928–2015), Dutch sprinter
Saat (cigarette)

Estonian-language surnames